Laevilitorina is a genus of small sea snails, marine gastropod molluscs in the family Littorinidae, the winkles or periwinkles.

Species
Species in the genus Laevilitorina include:  
 Laevilitorina alta (Powell, 1940)
 Laevilitorina antarctica (E. A. Smith, 1902)
 Laevilitorina antipodum (Filhol, 1880)
 Laevilitorina aucklandica (Powell, 1933)
 Laevilitorina bifasciata (Suter, 1913
 Laevilitorina bruniensis (Beddome, 1883)
 Laevilitorina caliginosa (Gould, 1849)
 Laevilitorina claviformis Preston, 1916
 Laevilitorina delli (Powell, 1955)
 Laevilitorina granum Pfeffer in Martens & Pfeffer, 1886
 Laevilitorina hamiltoni (E.A. Smith, 1898)
 Laevilitorina heardensis Dell, 1964
 Laevilitorina johnstoni (Cotton, 1945)
 Laevilitorina kingensis (May, 1924)
 Laevilitorina latior Preston, 1912
 Laevilitorina macphersonae (Dell, 1964)
 Laevilitorina mariae (Tenison Woods, 1876)
 Laevilitorina pygmaea Pfeffer in Martens & Pfeffer, 1886
 Laevilitorina umbilicata Pfeffer in Martens & Pfeffer, 1886
 Laevilitorina venusta Pfeffer in Martens & Pfeffer, 1886
 Laevilitorina wandelensis (Lamy, 1905)
Species brought into synonymy
 Laevilitorina antarctica (Martens, 1885): synonym of Laevilacunaria antarctica (Martens, 1885)
 Laevilitorina bennetti (Preston, 1916): synonym of Laevilacunaria bennetti (Preston, 1916)
 Laevilitorina bennetti Preston, 1912: synonym of Eatoniella bennetti (Preston, 1912)
 Laevilitorina burni Ponder, 1976: synonym of Laevilitorina johnstoni (Cotton, 1945)
 Laevilitorina coriacea (Melvill & Standen, 1907): synonym of Laevilitorina caliginosa (Gould, 1849)
 Laevilitorina cystophora Finlay, 1924: synonym of Rissoella cystophora (Finlay, 1924)
 Laevilitorina elongata Pelseneer, 1903: synonym of Laevilitorina caliginosa (Gould, 1849)
 Laevilitorina iredalei Brookes, 1926: synonym of  Elachisina iredalei (Brookes, 1926)
 Laevilitorina labioflecta Dell, 1990: synonym of Dickdellia labioflecta (Dell, 1990)
 Laevilitorina micra Finlay, 1924: synonym of Rissoella micra (Finlay, 1924)
 Laevilitorina pumilio (E.A. Smith, 1875): synonym of Laevilacunaria pumilio (E. A. Smith, 1875)

References

 Martens E. von; Pfeffer G. (1886). Die Mollusken von Süd - Georgien nach der Ausbeute der Deutschen Station 1882-83. Jahrbuch der Hamburgischen Wissenschaftlichen Anstalten. 3(5): 63-135, pl. 1-4
 Reid, D.G. (1989a) The comparative morphology, phylogeny and evolution of the gastropod family Littorinidae. Philosophical Transactions of the Royal Society of London, Series B 324: 1-110

Further reading 
 Powell A. W. B., New Zealand Mollusca, William Collins Publishers Ltd, Auckland, New Zealand 1979

External links
 GBIF

Littorinidae